The National Federation of Rural Letter Carriers was a labor union representing rural letter carriers in the United States Postal Service.

The union was founded in 1920, as a split from the National Rural Letter Carriers' Association, and on January 9 it was chartered by the American Federation of Labor.  By 1925, it had only 300 members.  On October 23, 1946, it merged into the National Association of Letter Carriers.

References

Postal trade unions
Trade unions established in 1920
Trade unions disestablished in 1946